The Bandy World Cup is an international bandy competition played in Sweden at the beginning of the bandy season every year, in autumn. The participating teams qualify based on their results in the previous bandy season.

The World Cup is not played by national teams but is for bandy clubs from around the world, and should therefore not be confused with the Bandy World Championship. It is usually considered to be "the world championship for clubs". The tournament has been dominated by Swedish and Russian teams.

History
The Bandy World Cup was held every year in Ljusdal in Sweden from 1974 to 2008, at the start of the bandy season in autumn. From 2009 it has been played indoors in Sandviken because Ljusdal was waiting for an indoor arena. The outdoor ices were too unpredictable because of the weather this time of the year, so for the 2009 cup the Federation of International Bandy demanded the cup should be played indoors. It was first decided to move the cup temporarily to Sandviken for two years, but when Ljusdal still had no indoor arena, a contract was made between FIB and Sandviken to host the cup in Sandviken up to and including 2013. If there is an indoor arena in Ljusdal in 2014, Ljusdal may apply to arrange the cup again.

The tournament was first held in 1974 and has been called the World Cup since 1980. The full name of the cup has changed over the years, partly because of different sponsors. The first two years it was called DAF-cupen, then Dex-cupen 1976–1979 and Dex World Cup 1980–1983. 1984–1985 it was simply called World Cup Ljusdal. 1986 SJ became sponsors, so it was SJ World Cup 1986–1998. Then Ljusdal World Cup until 2001 and since 2002 it has been known as the Bandy World Cup, in 2005 additionally as Polar Bandy World Cup, since 2006 as ExTe World Cup Bandy.

There is also a Bandy World Cup Women for women's teams.

World Cup winners and runners-up

References

External links
 World Cup

 
World Cup
International bandy competitions hosted by Sweden
Ljusdal Municipality
Sandviken Municipality
Bandy
Recurring sporting events established in 1974
1974 establishments in Sweden
Sport in Gävleborg County
October sporting events
Sports club competitions
Multi-national professional sports leagues